This is an incomplete list of police stations, world-wide, that are individually notable.  This includes current and former police stations that have been recognized and documented by historic registries, as well as other historic or modern ones that have been the locations of major events or otherwise received substantial coverage.

Hong Kong

India
Ramgopalpet Police Station, in Secunderabad

United Kingdom 

 List of police stations in the West Midlands

United States
7th District Police Station
48th Police Precinct Station
52nd Police Precinct Station House and Stable
75th Police Precinct Station House
83rd Precinct Police Station and Stable
Coral Gables Police and Fire Station
District 13 Police Station
Eighth Precinct Police Station
Former 18th Police Precinct Station House and Stable
Fullerton City Hall
Glendale Police Station
Highland Park Police Station
Kansas City Police Station Number 4
Northern District Police Station
Old Pine Street Station
Old Police Headquarters
Police Station No. 2 (Cincinnati, Ohio)
Police Station No. 3 (Cincinnati, Ohio)
Police Station No. 6 (Cincinnati, Ohio)
Police Station No. 7 (Cincinnati, Ohio)
Portland Police Block
Southern District Police Station
Third Precinct Police Station
Waldo Street Police Station
Whittenton Fire and Police Station
Ones without NRHP category:
42nd Precinct / Town Hall Police Station
1200 Travis
Cedarville Opera House
H. F. Barrows Manufacturing Company Building
Kansas City Police Station Number 4
Peter Pierce Store
Police Station No. 5 (Cincinnati, Ohio)
Quincy Police Station

See also
List of fire stations

References

!
Police stations, List of